Gregory Mahau (born 9 May 1994) is a Belgian footballer who currently plays for KRC Harelbeke.

External links

1994 births
Living people
Belgian footballers
Belgian Pro League players
Challenger Pro League players
K.V. Kortrijk players
K.V.V. Coxyde players
Association football midfielders
Sint-Eloois-Winkel Sport players